John Beury Gallaudet (August 23, 1903 – November 5, 1983) was an American film and television actor.

Career
Gallaudet was born in Philadelphia and attended Williams College. His Broadway credits included Good Men and True (1935), Lost Horizons (1934), Here Goes the Bride (1931), The Gang's All Here (1931), On the Spot (1930), Don Q., Jr. (1926), and When You Smile (1925).

In the 1959 TV Western Bat Masterson, he played General Sherman, whose life was in danger post Civil War while visiting Dodge City forcing Bat to act as his Secret Service escort in town. Gallaudet also appeared in episodes of Perry Mason.

Personal life
He was married to Constance Helen Gallaudet.

On November 5, 1983, Gallaudet died in Los Angeles at age 80.

Selected filmography

 Counterfeit (1936)
 Adventure in Manhattan (1936)
 Come Closer, Folks (1936)
 Shakedown (1936)
 The Devil's Playground (1937)
 Racketeers in Exile (1937)
 The Main Event (1938)
 One Hour to Live (1939)
 Shadows Over Chinatown (1946)
 Louisiana (1947)
 Stage Struck (1948)
 Docks of New Orleans (1948)
 Missing Women (1951)
 The Caddy (1953)
 Double Jeopardy (1955)
 No Man's Woman (1955)
 Terror at Midnight (1956)
 A Private's Affair (1959) - Surgeon General (uncredited)
 Leave It To Beaver "Beaver’s Tonsils" (2/11/1961)
 Go Naked in the World (1961) - Rupert - Vice Squad Detective (uncredited)
 Leave It To Beaver "Beaver the Caddy" (2/14/63)
 The Patsy (1964) - Barney (uncredited)
 The Happy Ending (1969) - Airplane Passenger (uncredited)

References

Bibliography
 Pitts, Michael R. Western Movies: A Guide to 5,105 Feature Films. McFarland, 2012.

External links

1903 births
1983 deaths
American male film actors
American male television actors
Burials at Pacific View Memorial Park
20th-century American male actors
Williams College alumni